Craig James Fox is an American rock musician from West Harrison, Indiana, best known as the lead singer and guitarist for the Cincinnati band The Greenhornes. Fox also plays guitar in other Cincinnati, Ohio-based bands called The Cincinnati Suds, lead vocals/guitar in Oxford Cotton, and backing guitar/vocals in Pearlene.

Discography
 1999 The Greenhornes – Gun For You
 2001 The Greenhornes – The Greenhornes
 2002 The Greenhornes – Dual Mono
 2005 The Greenhornes – East Grand Blues
 2005 The Greenhornes – Sewed Soles
 2007 The Cincinnati Suds – In Your Bedroom
 2010 The Greenhornes – Four Stars

References

American rock musicians
Living people
Musicians from Cincinnati
1975 births
The Greenhornes members